Denise Jacqueline Smith  is a former British wheelchair athlete. A Paralympian and longtime wheelchair athlete, Smith won the inaugural London Marathon wheelchair race in a time of 4:29:03. She competed in ice sledge speed racing at the 1984 Winter Paralympics and won three silver medals in the 100, 300, and 500 metre grade I events.

Smith was appointed Member of the Order of the British Empire (MBE) in the 1993 New Year Honours for service to sport for disabled people.

References

External links
 

Year of birth missing (living people)
Living people
British female wheelchair racers
Paralympic ice sledge speed racers of Great Britain
Ice sledge speed racers at the 1984 Winter Paralympics
Paralympic silver medalists for Great Britain
Paralympic wheelchair racers
Medalists at the 1984 Winter Paralympics
Members of the Order of the British Empire
The Sunday Times Sportswoman of the Year winners
Paralympic medalists in ice sledge speed racing
20th-century British women
21st-century British women